Worldbroken is a live album by post-hardcore band Saccharine Trust, released in 1985 through SST. The album was recorded live and completely improvised. Mike Watt of Minutemen stepped in to play bass for the 1985 show.

Worldbroken received critical praise and was an influence on Unknown Instructors' first album The Way Things Work Double bassist Damon Smith, who appeared on the Grizzly Man soundtrack, has credited the album with altering his views on punk rock, jazz, and free-form jamming.

Track listing

Personnel 

Saccharine Trust
Joe Baiza – guitar
Jack Brewer – vocals
Tony Cicero – drums
Mike Watt – bass guitar

Additional musicians and production
Glenn Aulepp – mixing
Joe Carducci – production
Saccharine Trust – production
Sam Winans – engineering

References

External links 
 

1985 live albums
SST Records live albums
Saccharine Trust albums